The 2006 Nevada gubernatorial election was held on November 7, 2006. Incumbent Governor Kenny Guinn could not run due to term limits. Republican Congressman Jim Gibbons defeated Democratic State Senator Dina Titus. As of 2022, this is the most recent election in which Nevada voted for a gubernatorial candidate of the same party as the incumbent president.

Democratic primary

Candidates
 Dina Titus, Minority Leader of the Nevada Senate
 James B. Gibson, Mayor of Henderson
 Leola McConnell, liberal activist

Results

Republican Party

Candidates
 Bob Beers, Nevada State Senator
 Jim Gibbons, U.S. Representative from Nevada's 2nd congressional district and nominee in 1994
 Lorraine Hunt, Lieutenant Governor of Nevada
 Stan Lusak, perennial candidate
 Melody "Mimi Miyagi" Damayo, former adult film actress

Results

Other parties

Green Party
 Craig Bergland, activist

Independent American Party
Christopher Hansen

Campaign

Predictions

Polling

Results

References

External links
Campaign websites (Archived)
Jim Gibbons
Dina Titus
Bob Beers
Melody Damayo

Governor
2006
2006 United States gubernatorial elections